Heterohelicidae is a family of foraminifera belonging to the superfamily Heterohelicoidea and the suborder Globigerinina.

Genera

The family Heterohelicidae consists of the following subfamilies and genera:
 Subfamily Gublerininae
 Bifarina
 Gublerina
 Rectoguembelina
 Sigalia
 Subfamily Heterohelicinae
 Heterohelix
 Laeviheterohelix
 Lunatriella
 Planoglobulina
 Pseudoplanoglobulina
 Pseudotextularia
 Racemiguembelina
 Spiroplecta
 Steineckia
 Ventilabrella
 Subfamily Pseudoguembelininae
 Pseudoguembelina
 Striataella
not assigned to a subfamily
 Braunella
 Hartella
 Huberella
 Lipsonia
 Parasigalia
 Planoheterohelix
 Praegublerina
 Protoheterohelix
 Zeauvigerina

References

External links

Foraminiferida

Foraminifera families
Globigerinina